The Province of Rome was one of the five provinces that formed part of the region of Lazio in Italy. It was established in 1870 and disestablished in 2014. It was essentially coterminous with the Rome metropolitan area. The city of Rome was the provincial capital. During the 1920s, the boundary of the province shrank as land was ceded to establish new provinces. The Province of Rome was the most populous province in Italy. On 1 January 2015, it was superseded by a new local government body—the Metropolitan City of Rome Capital.

History

Prior to 1870, the area of the province was the Papal States. Following the capture of Rome by the forces of the Kingdom of Italy, the Province of Rome was established. The province was initially divided into five "districts" ( or ): Rome, Civitavecchia, Frosinone, Velletri and Viterbo. They corresponded to the old papal delegazioni.

In 1923 the district of Rieti, formerly part of the province of Perugia, was annexed to that of Rome. In 1927 the provincial territory was reduced through the creation of new provinces: Frosinone, Rieti and Viterbo. After a few months, the comuni of Amaseno, Castro dei Volsci and  Vallecorsa also were annexed to the province of Frosinone, while Monte Romano was annexed to that of Viterbo. In 1934 the provincial territory lost its southern part, which became the new Province of Latina.

See also

 Administrative subdivisions of the Papal States from 1816 to 1871
 Latium — the oldest regional division of the former province & present day Metropolitan City of Rome Capital.

References

External links

Official former website
Rome Quality of Life and Info Sheet

 
.
Rome
1870 establishments in Italy
2014 disestablishments in Italy
States and territories established in 1870
States and territories disestablished in 2014